Enforcer is an unofficial role in ice hockey. The term is sometimes used synonymously with "fighter", "tough guy", or "goon". An enforcer's job is to deter and respond to dirty or violent play by the opposition. When such play occurs, the enforcer is expected to respond aggressively, by fighting or checking the offender. Enforcers are expected to react particularly harshly to violence against star players or goalies.

Enforcers are different from pests, players who seek to agitate opponents and distract them from the game, without necessarily fighting them. The pest's primary role is to draw penalties from opposing players, thus "getting them off their game", while not actually intending to fight the opposition player (although exceptions to this do occur). Pests and enforcers often play together on the same line, usually the fourth line.

National Hockey League
At present in the National Hockey League (NHL), teams generally do not carry more than one player whose primary role is that of an enforcer. Enforcers can play either forward or defense, although they are most frequently used as wingers on the fourth forward checking line. Prized for their aggression, size, checking ability, and fists, enforcers are typically less gifted at skill areas of the game than their teammates. Enforcers are typically among the lowest scoring players on the team and receive a smaller share of ice time. They are also not highly paid compared to other players, and tend to move from team to team.

Enforcers are nevertheless often popular on their teams. John Branch wrote in The New York Times: "The enforcer, sometimes mocked as a goon or euphemized as a tough guy, may be hockey's favorite archetype. Enforcers are seen as working-class superheroes—understated types with an alter ego willing to do the sport's most dangerous work to protect others. And they are underdogs, men who otherwise might have no business in the game." 

John Scott's reputation as an enforcer and fan favorite helped him earn enough fan votes to secure a spot in the 61st National Hockey League All-Star Game, despite having been demoted out of the league at the time of his election. He unexpectedly played a key role in his division's victory by scoring two goals, where fan response also led to him being named the most valuable player of the tournament. Fighting skills can help a less-talented or smaller player play in leagues that their hockey alone would not.

Enforcers sometimes take boxing lessons to improve their fighting. Some players combine aspects of the enforcer role with strong play in other areas of the game. Tiger Williams, Bob Probert, Chris Simon, and Tom Wilson are examples of enforcers who showed an occasional scoring flair, with Williams and Probert playing in the midseason All-Star Game. Terry O'Reilly once scored 90 points in a season, being the first player to finish in the top ten regular season scorers while amassing at least 200 penalty minutes, and later became captain of the Boston Bruins.

Sometimes enforcers can do their job by virtue of their reputation. Clark Gillies was among the best fighters in the NHL during his prime, but over time he rarely had to fight because opponents respected and feared him enough that they would not go after his teammates. Some skilled players, such as legends Gordie Howe, NHL all-star Jarome Iginla, and Ryan O'Marra, are also capable fighters and can function effectively as their own enforcer. A "Gordie Howe hat trick" is a player scoring a goal, assisting on a goal, and being involved in a fight during a single game.

Changing role
In the 1970s, the Boston Bruins and Philadelphia Flyers were known respectively as the "Big Bad Bruins" and "Broad Street Bullies", for stocking up on grinders and enforcers.

The role of the enforcer has diminished since rule enforcement changed following the 2004–05 NHL lockout to increase game speed and scoring. With a decrease in fighting, teams are less inclined to keep a roster spot available for a one-dimensional fighter who is a liability as a scorer and defender. This has led to a decrease in the number of players whose predominant role is enforcer.

Instead, more well-rounded players are expected to contribute aspects of the enforcer role. Intimidation and fighting continue to be utilized as a strategy in the NHL. In the 2007–08 NHL season fights occurred in 38.46% of the games, up from 33% the season before, which was just below the pre-lockout fighting level of 41.14% of games in the 2003–04 season. The frequency has steadily declined over time, from 1.3 fights per game in the late 1980s to 0.5 in 2012. Major penalties for fighting declined by 25% annually in the first half of the 2011–2012 season.

Summer 2011 enforcer deaths
Another possible reason for the decline in fighting and the use of the enforcer role is greater awareness of the risks from head trauma and resulting chronic traumatic encephalopathy (CTE). During the summer of 2011, three NHL enforcers died. Derek Boogaard died at the age of 28 from an accidental mixture of painkillers and alcohol. Rick Rypien died at the age of 27 from what was later confirmed as a suicide. Wade Belak was found dead at the age of 35 in his Toronto hotel room in circumstances that caused a newspaper's police source to categorize his death as a suicide. A year earlier, Bob Probert had died in July 2010, of an apparent heart attack in his mid-40s. Later tests indicated brain damage and CTE from his years of fighting.

Retired enforcer Georges Laraque has suggested that the National Hockey League Players' Association provide counselling to enforcers. Sports journalist and writer Roy Macgregor opines that in light of recent tragic events there should be more done about it, including eliminating the role altogether. New York Times sportswriter John Branch covered Boogaard's death and the epidemic of chronic traumatic encephalopathy that has come as a result of frequent head trauma sustained by hockey enforcers.

See also
List of NHL enforcers
Violence in ice hockey — about violent acts that are prohibited by all ice hockey leagues

References

External links
ESPN: Goons
"The Toughest Guys on Ice BBC World Service, Assignment, 22 January 2012

Ice hockey terminology
Violence in ice hockey